Hans-Ulrich Schmied (born 23 February 1947) is a retired German rower who specialized in the double sculls. In this event he won bronze medals at the 1972 and 1976 Olympic Games and finished in fifth place in 1968. He also won one world (1974) and two European titles (1971 and 1973). Schmied went to the 1978 World Rowing Championships on Lake Karapiro in New Zealand as a reserve but did not compete. It was at those championships that he got closer to one of the female rowers whom she later married; Bärbel Bendiks was also present as a reserve.

After retiring from competitions he worked as a rowing coach, particularly with Arno Bergmann, Erwin Krakau and Gerhard Rothe.

References

External links
 
 
 

1947 births
Living people
East German male rowers
Olympic rowers of East Germany
Olympic bronze medalists for East Germany
Olympic medalists in rowing
Rowers at the 1968 Summer Olympics
Rowers at the 1972 Summer Olympics
Rowers at the 1976 Summer Olympics
Medalists at the 1976 Summer Olympics
Medalists at the 1972 Summer Olympics
World Rowing Championships medalists for East Germany
European Rowing Championships medalists
People from Meissen
Sportspeople from Saxony